Hovnan Mayravanetsi (c. 572-650) was an Armenian theologian and philosopher, and ardent defender of Miaphysite position of the Armenian Church. He was one of the first theologians to address issues of social justice in the light of the Christian teaching, which set him on a collision course with his contemporary feudal socioeconomic structures. In his later years he had become an ascetic.

References

572 births
650 deaths
Armenian philosophers
Armenian theologians